Blake Bjorklund (born September 8, 1985) is an American professional stock car racing driver. He has raced in the NASCAR Craftsman Truck Series, Nationwide Series, and the ARCA Re/Max Series. In addition to racing stock cars, he has also raced snowmobiles.

Racing career

ARCA Re/Max Series
Before his venture into NASCAR, Bjorklund raced in the series full-time for one year in 2006. He made a run for Rookie of the Year with Country Joe Racing, a team well known for developing young talents such as Joey Miller and Ryan Hemphill. Although he failed to qualify for the season-opening Daytona and Nashville races, he bounced back with poles at Berlin and Milwaukee and earned his first career victory at Salem Speedway, passing ARCA legend Frank Kimmel with two laps to go. Bjorklund also earned the Bill France Triple Crown award for the three dirt tracks on the ARCA schedule. He finished the season 5th in points with one win, ten finishes in the top ten, and two poles.

Craftsman Truck Series
In 2007, Bjorklund was signed by MRD Motorsports to run in the then-NASCAR Craftsman Truck Series. Driving the No. 8 Chevrolet Silverado, he earned a best finish of 13th place at Nashville Superspeedway.

Nationwide Series
After his release from his truck ride, Bjorklund was signed late in 2007 by Jay Robinson Racing to drive the No. 28 U.S. Border Patrol/Kibbles 'n Bits Chevrolet in three races. Two of his races were ended early by engine failures and he was only able to muster a best finish of 30th at California Speedway.

In 2009, Bjorklund returned to the Nationwide Series in the Meijer 300 at Kentucky Speedway, but failed to qualify the No. 96 K-Automotive Motorsports Dodge.

Motorsports career results

NASCAR
(key) (Bold – Pole position awarded by qualifying time. Italics – Pole position earned by points standings or practice time. * – Most laps led.)

Nationwide Series

Craftsman Truck Series

ARCA Re/Max Series

References

External links
 
 

Living people
1985 births
People from Isanti County, Minnesota
Racing drivers from Minnesota
NASCAR drivers
ARCA Menards Series drivers
ARCA Midwest Tour drivers